The year 2004 in rugby league football centered on Australasia's 2004 NRL season and Super League IX.

January
26th - Sydney, Australia: The Rugby League International Federation announces that the next World Cup will be held in Australia in 2008 to celebrate the centenary of the game in the Southern Hemisphere.

February
13th - Huddersfield, England: The 2004 World Club Challenge is won by the Bradford Bulls who defeated the Penrith Panthers 22-4 at Alfred McAlpine Stadium before a crowd of 18,962.
24th - Coffs Harbour, Australia: Several players from the Bulldogs NRL club face police investigation after a complaint of sexual assault from a 20-year-old woman. No charges were laid.

March
12th - Sydney, Australia: The first round of the NRL's 2004 Telstra Premiership begins with 2003 champions, the Penrith Panthers losing 14-20 to the Newcastle Knights before a crowd of 19,936 at Penrith Stadium.

April
25 - Widnes, England: Widnes Vikings hooker Shane Millard completes a match with a fragment of tooth embedded in his head after a head clash in the first half with the Castleford Tigers' Dean Ripley.

May
15th - Cardiff, Wales: The 2004 Challenge Cup tournament culminates in St Helens's 32–16 victory against Wigan in the final at Millennium Stadium before a crowd of 73,734.

June
17th - Leeds, England: The Rugby Football League bans St Helens R.F.C. players Martin Gleeson (4 months) and Sean Long (3 months) and fines each £7,500 plus £2,205 costs for a betting scandal.

July
7th - Sydney, Australia: The 2004 State of Origin series is won by New South Wales who defeated Queensland 36–14 in the third and deciding game of the series at Telstra Stadium before a crowd of 82,487.

August
4th - Sydney, Australia: The National Rugby League judiciary hands down an 18-week suspension to Melbourne forward Danny Williams for a king hit on Wests forward Mark O'Neill in Round 19.

September
22nd - Sydney, Australia: The 6th annual Tom Brock Lecture, entitled No more bloody bundles for Britain: The Post-World War II tours of the British and French Allies, is delivered by Tom Keneally, AO

October
4th - Sydney, Australia: The NRL season culminates in the 2004 NRL Grand final in which the Bulldogs defeat the Sydney Roosters 16-13 at Telstra Stadium before a crowd of 82,127.

November
7 - Warrington, England: The 2004 European Nations Cup tournament culminates in England's 36-12 victory over Ireland in the final at Halliwell Jones Stadium before a crowd of 3,582
16th - Manchester, England the Super League season culminates in the 2004 Super League Grand final in which the Leeds Rhinos defeat the Bradford Bulls 16-8 at Old Trafford before a crowd of 65,547.
22 - Leeds, England: At the 2004 RLIF Awards Great Britain captain Andy Farrell is awarded the Golden Boot Award for the World's best player.
27 - Leeds, England: The 2004 Tri-Nations tournament culminates in Australia's victory over Great Britain in the final at Elland Road before a crowd of 39,120.

December
23rd - Leeds, England: The Rugby Football League fines Keith Senior and Ryan Bailey £1,500 each after they tested positive to the banned stimulant ephedrine.

References

 
Rugby league by year